The Oriental riff, also known as the East Asian riff and the Chinaman lick, is a musical riff or phrase that has often been used in Western culture as a trope to represent the idea of East or Southeast Asia. The riff is sometimes accompanied by the sound of a gong.

History 
The Oriental riff is a Western creation. The first known example of a precursor, showing similar rhythm if not yet melody, is the "Aladdin Quick Step", composed around 1847 and used in an Aladdin stage show named The Grand Chinese Spectacle of Aladdin or The Wonderful Lamp. Later related tunes included "Mama's China Twins (Oriental Lullaby)" from 1900. In the 1930s, a couple of cartoons used a version of the tune specifically to accompany animated stereotypes of East Asians.

The notes used in the riff are part of a pentatonic scale and often harmonized with parallel open fourths, which makes the riff sound like East Asian music to the casual Western listener..

Uses 
The Oriental riff and interpretations of it have been included as part of numerous musical works in Western music. Examples of its use include Poetic Moods (1889) by Antonin Dvořák, "Limehouse Blues" by Carl Ambrose and his Orchestra (1935), "Kung Fu Fighting" by Carl Douglas (1974), "Japanese Boy" by Aneka (1981), The Vapors' "Turning Japanese" (1980), "Chinese Laundry Blues" by George Formby (1932), Rush's "A Passage to Bangkok" (1976), and as part of the whistling refrain in "Young Folks" by Peter Bjorn and John (2006),  "Shanghai" by Lee Marrow (1985)

The Oriental riff has also come to be used in many Japanese compositions as well, particularly in video games; these include Yie Ar Kung-Fus main theme, the Chai Kingdom theme in Super Mario Land, Dragon Chan and Hoy Quarlow’s theme in Super Punch-Out!!, Min Min's theme in ARMS, the Team China stage in Super Dodge Ball, the song "Shao Pai Long" in The Super Dimension Fortress Macross, the fighting theme of the Kung-Fu chapter in Live A Live, and the track "Oriental Rush" in Yakuza: Like a Dragon. Unlike the Western use of it seen in cases such as "Turning Japanese", works produced in Japan often use it to give an impression of China.

See also
Aloha ʻOe 
Arabian riff
Jarabe Tapatío
Leitmotif
Limerick (song)
Pentatonic scale
Radio 4 UK Theme 
Rule Britannia
Shave and a Haircut
Song of the Volga Boatmen
Stereotypes of East Asians
Italian riff
Toccata and Fugue in D minor
Wonton font
Edelweiss
Frère Jacques
Down Under
When Irish Eyes Are Smiling
Auld Lang Syne
Scotland the Brave

References

East Asian music
Stereotypes of East Asian people
Musical analysis
Musical terminology
Orientalism
Riffs
1847 compositions